Nicholas Anderson (born February 3, 1975 in Spokane, Washington) is an American rower.

References

External links 
 

1975 births
Living people
American male rowers
Sportspeople from Spokane, Washington
World Rowing Championships medalists for the United States
Pan American Games medalists in rowing
Pan American Games gold medalists for the United States
Rowers at the 1999 Pan American Games
Medalists at the 1999 Pan American Games